is a Japanese billionaire businessman, chairman of the internet company DMM.com, who made his initial fortune in pornography.

In 1999, Kameyama founded DMM.com, and is its chairman.

DMM started in pornography and "adult entertainment", and has "grown into a vast collection of enterprises".

In August 2017, Kameyama had an estimated net worth of US$3.5 billion.

Kameyama is married, with two children.

References

1960s births
Living people
Japanese chief executives
Japanese billionaires
Date of birth missing (living people)